Henri, Prince of Condé may refer to:

 Henri, Prince of Condé (1552–1588)
 Henri, Prince of Condé (1588–1646)